Finance Watch is a European non-governmental organization that conducts research and advocacy on financial regulation.  Based in Brussels, the organization focuses on financial regulation in the European Union.

Finance Watch was founded in 2011 by members of the European Parliament as a counterbalance to the financial lobby. Its mission is "to strengthen the voice of society in the reform of financial regulation by conducting advocacy and presenting public interest arguments to lawmakers and the public as a counterweight to the private interest lobbying of the financial industry".

Background

Finance Watch was founded on 30 June 2011 as a consequence of a petition initiated in June 2010 by 22  members of the European Parliament, including members of all major political groups (ALDE, EPP, Greens-EFA, GUE/NGL, and S&D). This call for action was signed by another 140 elected officials from across Europe, and led to an exploratory project funded by the initiators, which in turn resulted in the founding General Assembly on 30 June 2011. Ieke van den Burg, a former MEP, was appointed Chair of the Board of Directors and Thierry Philipponnat, a former banker and Amnesty International executive in France, became the Secretary General. In January 2017, Benoît Lallemand became Secretary General.

Activities
The organization's research team analyses financial regulation and formulates policy recommendations. Its views are then communicated to policymakers by its advocacy team, who also cooperate with member organizations who share the same views, and to the wider public by its communication team. 
Examples of dossiers that Finance Watch deals with are capital requirements for banks (the Basel III agreement), banking structure (the Liikanen Consultation), high-frequency trading, food and resource speculation, and protection of retail investors. Finance Watch also organizes conferences about financial regulation issues, where different stakeholders of the financial sector interact in public.

Structure and financing
Finance Watch is an international association under Belgian law (AISBL), and has two types of members: individuals and civil society organizations. The latter include consumer groups, trade unions, housing associations, environmental NGOs, development NGOs and others. Each member has an equal vote at the organization’s general assembly.  To become a member, both individuals and civil society organizations need to prove to the organization’s Committee of Transparency and Independence that they are independent from the financial industry. Individual members also need to qualify for membership by showing they have relevant experience and expertise. The members convene at least once a year for a General Assembly. During the year, the General Assembly is represented by the Board of Directors. The Board comprises eight Directors including six elected by and from the General Assembly (four Member organisations and two individual Members) and two independent Directors (“external personalities”).

Members of the Finance Watch board of directors as of October 2020:
 Chair: Alexandra Andhov, University of Copenhagen
 Vice-chair: Marek Hudon, Université Libre de Bruxelles, Belgium
 Rachel Oliver, Positive Money
 Erwan Malary, Secours Catholique
 Rainer Geiger, Attorney-at-law
 Nadine Strauss, University of Oxford
Patricia Suárez, ASUFIN (Asociación de Usuarios Financieros)
Anna Maria Romano, FISAC/CGIL

The organization’s budget has as its main sources project funding from the European Union and grants from several charitable foundations: Adessium Foundation, Fondation pour le progrès de l’homme, Friedrich-Ebert-Stiftung, Better Markets, Open Society Initiative for Europe, as well as individual donations and members’ fees and contributions.

Principles
The declared mission of Finance Watch is “to strengthen the voice of society in the reform of financial regulation by conducting advocacy and presenting public interest arguments to lawmakers and the public as a counterweight to the private interest lobbying of the financial industry”.

The organization states it follows six principles in the pursuit of this mission:

 The role of the financial industry (allocating capital, managing risk and providing financial services) has strong public interest implications. 
 The primary role of finance is to allocate capital to productive use. 
 Finance must serve the real economy, not the inverse.
 Banks are legitimate in pursuing profits to ensure their sustainability, but profits should not harm public interest.
 Credit risk should not be transferred to society at large.
 The real economy needs to have access to capital and financial services, in a sustainable, equitable and transparent manner.

National partners 
Finance Watch has national partners in Germany (Bürgerbewegung Finanzwende, headed by Gerhard Schick) and France.

See also
 Bank regulation
 Financial regulation
 Lobbying in the European Union

References

External links 
 Finance Watch Homepage
 Finance Watch – a lobby to break the lobbies  - English translation of an article from der Tagesspiegel - 23 February 2012
 Finance Watch, les transfuges rebelles de la finance - Article on Finance Watch on Slate.fr (in French) - 11 February 2013.
 Finance Watch keeps an eye on markets - short article on the Trade Stock Markets website - 26 October 2012 (Renewed link - 26 October 2017).
 Group launched to parry EU banking lobby (archived) - Financial Times article about the launch of Finance Watch - 1 July 2011.

Financial regulation
International organisations based in Belgium
Organisations based in Brussels
Organizations established in 2011